The Key is a 2014 erotic drama film loosely based on Jun'ichirō Tanizaki's novel by the same name. It was released in the United States on November 21, 2014 and was released on DVD on July 16, 2015.
Jack and Ida are a disenchanted married couple whose sexual relationship is told through their personal journals.

References

External links 
 
 

Films based on works by Jun'ichirō Tanizaki
American erotic drama films
2010s erotic drama films
2014 drama films
2010s English-language films
Films directed by Jefery Levy
2010s American films